Praethera is a genus of moths in the family Geometridae erected by Jaan Viidalepp in 1980.

Species
Praethera anomala (Inoue, 1954)
Praethera praefecta (Prout, 1914)

References

Cidariini